The BYU Testing Center, the largest college testing center in the nation, is located in the Heber J. Grant Building at Brigham Young University. It serves the purpose of administering tests to students.  Tests are often administered in the Testing Center instead of during class time.  By doing this, instructors allow students to take as much time as they need for the test, do not waste class time on testing, and allow students to take tests at their convenience.

Building history

The Heber J. Grant Building was originally built as the BYU library.  It was dedicated in 1925 by Heber J. Grant, the first building completed while Franklin S. Harris was president of BYU.  The library was housed on the second floor, while the first floor contained classrooms.

After the building of the Harold B. Lee Library the building was used as a museum by the College of Biology and Agriculture until this was moved to the Monte L. Bean Life Science Museum. In 1982 the building began its use as the university's testing center.

Current functions

The main portion of the Testing Center is a large main testing room, which originally served as BYU's library, and now is filled with approximately 650 desks. Students enter through the center's administration area.  The center also has a few smaller rooms with even more desks (one of which, the music room, has soft classical music playing through wall-mounted speakers), study hall rooms downstairs for test preparation, and faculty offices.

When students exit the testing center, they can see their scores immediately on the BYU Testing Center website (for multiple-choice tests). Earlier, those taking multiple-choice tests waited for a moment or two in the administration area to receive a printout of their results, which usually resulted in the exit area being crowded.

In order to avoid long lines during finals, the testing center opens remote locations around campus.  Generally the Wilkinson Student Center (WSC) serves all religion finals while the Joseph Smith Building (JSB) Auditorium is used for larger classes such as American Heritage. Lines are usually shortest before 11:00 AM, in the early afternoon, and after 7:00 PM.

References

External links 
 National College Testing Association
 Official website of BYU
 BYU Testing Services

Brigham Young University buildings